Kahurdan (also Romanized as Kahūrdān; also known as Kāhūdān) is a village in Karian Rural District, in the Central District of Minab County, Hormozgan Province, Iran. At the 2006 census, its population was 430, in 84 families.

References 

Populated places in Minab County